Höhr-Grenzhausen is a Verbandsgemeinde ("collective municipality") in the district Westerwaldkreis, in Rhineland-Palatinate, Germany. The seat of the Verbandsgemeinde is in Höhr-Grenzhausen.

The Verbandsgemeinde Höhr-Grenzhausen consists of the following Ortsgemeinden ("local municipalities"):

 Hilgert 
 Hillscheid 
 Höhr-Grenzhausen
 Kammerforst

Verbandsgemeinde in Rhineland-Palatinate